Priechod is a village and municipality in Banská Bystrica District in the Banská Bystrica Region of central Slovakia.

History
In historical records the village was first mentioned in 1340.

Geography
The municipality lies at an altitude of 460 metres and covers an area of 11.211 km2. It has a population of about 908 people.

References

External links
 https://web.archive.org/web/20130225083828/http://www.priechod.sk/v2/

Villages and municipalities in Banská Bystrica District